The International Organisation of Good Templars (IOGT; founded as the Independent Order of Good Templars), whose international body is known as Movendi International, is a fraternal organization which is part of the temperance movement, promoting abstinence from alcohol and other drugs.

It describes itself as "the premier global interlocutor for evidence-based policy measures and community-based interventions to prevent and reduce harm caused by alcohol and other drugs". It claims to be the largest worldwide community of non-governmental organisations with a mission to independently enlighten people around the world on a lifestyle free from alcohol and other drugs.

Founded in 1851, IOGT International works to promote the avoidance of alcohol and other drugs by supporting communities and societies around the world. Its constitution say this will lead to the liberation of peoples of the world, this leading to a richer, freer and more rewarding life. The headquarters of IOGT International is in Stockholm.

History
The IOGT originated as one of a number of fraternal organizations for temperance or total abstinence founded in the 19th century and with a structure modeled on Freemasonry, using similar ritual and regalia. Unlike many, however, it admitted men and women equally, and also made no distinction by race.

The IOGT named themselves after the Knights Templar, citing the legend that the original knights "drank sour milk, and also because they were fighting 'a great crusade' against 'this terrible vice' of alcohol."

In 1850, in Utica, New York, Daniel Cady founded one such organization, the Knights of Jericho. In 1851, a lodge of it in Oriskany Falls (then known as Castor Hollow), a village near Utica, was visited by 13 members of another Utica group. Under the leadership of Wesley Bailey, it was decided that these two lodges form the Order of Good Templars. The motto of the renamed organization was "Friendship, Hope and Charity".

Over the next year, 14 additional lodges were established. By the summer of 1852, a convention was called in Utica to establish a Grand Lodge. During this, a dispute broke out between Wesley Bailey and Leverett Coon, who had established a lodge, Excelsior, in Syracuse. Coon left the meeting and his lodge supported his actions by seceding as the Independent Order of Good Templars, with the motto altered to "Faith, Hope and Charity". They shortly merged back, the resulting group continuing under the name Independent Order of Good Templars.

The Order first grew rapidly in the United States and in Canada. In 1868, Joseph Malins returned to his native England and established a Birmingham lodge, from which IOGT spread to Europe and the rest of the world. Within three years the Order spread to Ireland, Wales, Australia, Malta, New Zealand, France, Portugal, South Africa, Bermuda, Belgium and East India. By 1876, it had established itself in Ceylon (Sri Lanka), Madras, British Honduras, British Guyana, Jamaica, Malacca, China, Japan, Sierra Leone, St. Helena, Argentina, Trinidad, Grenada and the Bahamas. This was followed by lodges in Norway, Sweden, Denmark, Iceland, Switzerland, Germany and Jerusalem.

From 1900 and onwards, further groups were set up in the Netherlands, Burma, Nigeria and Panama. In 1906, reflecting the International reach of the organisation the word "Independent" in its title, was replaced by "International".

From its inception, the Independent Order of Good Templars "campaigned for prohibition, strove to provide social facilities that served non-alcoholic beverages, promoted education and self-help, and supported decent working conditions for working people."

In an attempt to modernize its image the IOGT changed some of its titles and ritualistic features in the 1970s, the use of regalia and rituals began to diminish or were eliminated. In 1970, instead of "Order", the group became the International Organisation of Good Templars. The title of "Chief Templar" was changed to "President" and local units were given the option of calling themselves "Chapters"  rather than "Lodges". Instead of three degrees, only one, the Justice degree, was worked by 1979, and the ritual is no longer secret.

Membership 

In 1875, after the American Civil War, the American senior body voted to allow separate lodges and Grand Lodges for white and black members, to accommodate the practice of racial segregation in southern US states. In 1876, Malins and other British members failed in achieving an amendment to stop this, and left to establish a separate international body. In 1887 this and the American body were reconciled into a single IOGT.

Women were admitted as regular members early in the history of the Good Templar. In 1979, there were 700,000 members internationally, though only 2,000 in the country of the IOGTs origin, the United States.

Juvenile Templars
In the mid 1870s, Juvenile Templars, or Cold Water Temples (C.W.T), were established. An 1874 Journal of Proceedings report provided information that Cold Water Temples, or organizations very similar to them, existed in 24 Grand Lodge jurisdictions in Alabama, Canada, California, Colorado, Connecticut, England, Georgia, Illinois, Maine, Massachusetts, Michigan, Minnesota, North Carolina, New Hampshire, New Jersey, Nova Scotia, Ohio, Pennsylvania, Scotland, South Carolina, Texas, Vermont, Wisconsin, and Wales. A similar organization existed in Australia and Ireland. The children's organization in all of the British Grand Lodge jurisdictions—under the name of Juvenile Temples—was very similar to the C.W.T. It was worked successfully, but independently of R. W. G. L. In Alabama, Colorado, Connecticut, Illinois, Massachusetts, Michigan, Minnesota, North Carolina, New Hampshire, New Jersey, Nova Scotia, Ohio, South Carolina, Texas, and Vermont, it had not much more than a nominal existence.

From 1990 to 2017, in Europe, it had a youth division, "ACTIVE – sobriety, friendship, peace". Since then, youth organizations being member of IOGT International, form the group "IOGT Youth".

See also 
IOGT-NTO, the Swedish branch
List of Temperance organizations

References

Further reading
 David M. Fahey, "How the Good Templars Began: Fraternal Temperance in New York State", Social History of Alcohol Review, Nos. 38-39 (1999)
 David M. Fahey, "Temperance & Racism: John Bull, Johnny Reb, and the Good Templars" (University Press of Kentucky, 1996).

External links

Official IOGT website

International Organisation of Good Templars
Temperance organizations
Organizations established in 1851
Alcohol in Sweden
1851 establishments in New York (state)
Fraternal orders